Victor Tolgesy  (22 August 1928 – 6 January 1980) was a Hungarian-born Canadian sculptor. The Victor Tolgesy Arts Award is named in his honor.

Life and work
Tolgesy was born in  Miskolc, Hungary on 22 August 1928.  He emigrated to Canada in 1951.  He died in Ottawa, Ontario, 6 January 1980.

Tolgesy was made a member of the Royal Canadian Academy of Arts

In 1966, a sculpture by Tolgesy, Freedom for Hungary—Freedom for All was installed in Budapest Park in Toronto to commemorate the tenth anniversary of the Hungarian Uprising.

Legacy
The Victor Tolgesy Arts Award is presented jointly by the City of Ottawa and the Council for the Arts in Ottawa to recognize residents who have contributed to the cultural life of Ottawa. The first award was presented in 1987. The award consists of cash prize and a bronze casting of Tolgesy's 1963 sculpture Seed and Flower.

Notes

More 
Tolgesy, Victor. Acrobatics: A Tale of Fantasy and Reality in Words and Sculpture
(Ottawa:Edahl Productions Limited, 1985) , 9780969120537
A 'modern fairy tale' illustrated with color photographs of the author's sculptures.

External links 
 
 Victor Tolgesy on Toronto Sculpture

1928 births
1980 deaths
Canadian sculptors
Canadian male sculptors
Members of the Royal Canadian Academy of Arts
20th-century sculptors